Melanocoris is a genus of minute pirate bugs in the family Anthocoridae. There are at least four described species in Melanocoris.

Species
These four species belong to the genus Melanocoris:
 Melanocoris longirostris Kelton, 1977
 Melanocoris nigricornis Van Duzee, 1921
 Melanocoris obovatus Champion, 1900
 Melanocoris pingreensis (Drake & Harris, 1926)

References

Further reading

 
 

Anthocorini
Articles created by Qbugbot